Herman "Holly" Hollerith IV (born 1955) was the tenth bishop of the Episcopal Diocese of Southern Virginia, serving from 2009 till 2018.

Biography 
Hollerith was born in Baltimore, Maryland in 1955.  He studied at Denison University and graduated with a Bachelor of Science. He then studied at the Yale Divinity School from where he earned his Master of Divinity in 1983. He was ordained to the diaconate on June 11, 1983, and to the priesthood on December 10, 1983. He then became assistant at Christ Church in Roanoke, Virginia. He also served as rector of Bruton Parish Church in Williamsburg, Virginia and rector of Prince George Winyah in Georgetown, South Carolina.

He was consecrated on February 13, 2009, and retired on December 31, 2018.

His brother is Randolph Hollerith, the current Dean of Washington National Cathedral.

See also
 List of Episcopal bishops of the United States
 Historical list of the Episcopal bishops of the United States
Herman Hollerith

References

External links 
Diocesan website

Living people
1955 births
Episcopal bishops of Southern Virginia